The Shaanxi Provincial Library, also known as the Shaanxi Library, is a Xi'an-based large scale public library, located at No. 18, Chang'an North Road, Xi'an City. It is the earliest public library established in China's Western Region.

History
Built in August 1909, the Shaanxi Provincial Library was one of the first public libraries established in China. On 30 September 2001, the New Hall of Shaanxi Provincial Library was officially opened to the public.

References

Libraries in China
Buildings and structures in Shaanxi
Libraries established in 1909